is a metro station on the Osaka Metro in Nishinari-ku, Osaka, Japan. The name in English means "in front of the zoo".  It is one of the nearest stations to the Tennōji Zoo and Tsutenkaku.

The station is located close to the  station operated by JR West and Nankai Electric Railway, but no physical connection exists between these two stations.

Lines

 (M22)
 (K19)

Layout

Midōsuji Line
There are two side platforms with two tracks.

Sakaisuji Line
There is an island platform with two tracks under the Midosuji Line.

Surroundings
Shinsekai
Tsutenkaku
SpaWorld
Tennoji Park
Tennoji Zoo
Osaka Municipal Museum of Art
Imamiya-ebisu
Nishinari Police Station
Kamagasaki
Tobita Shinchi

Bus
Subway Dobutsuen-mae (Osaka City Bus)
Route 7: for Abenobashi / for Sumiyoshigawa-nishi
Route 48: for Abenobashi / for Subway Suminoekoen
Route 52: for Abenobashi / for Namba
Route 80: for Abenobashi / for Tsurumachi Yonchome

External links
  Dobutsuen-Mae Station Sakaisuji Line from Osaka Metro website
  Dobutsuen-Mae Station Sakaisuji Line from Osaka Metro website
  Dobutsuen-Mae Station Midosuji Line from Osaka Metro website
  Dobutsuen-Mae Station Midosuji Line from Osaka Metro website

Osaka Metro stations
Railway stations in Japan opened in 1938
Railway stations in Japan opened in 1969